The Danish PGA Championship was a golf tournament in the Nordic Golf League held in Denmark. From 1993 to 1997 it was an event on the Challenge Tour.

Winners

Sources:

Notes

References

External links
Coverage on the Challenge Tour's official site

Former Challenge Tour events
Golf tournaments in Denmark
Recurring sporting events established in 1993
1993 establishments in Denmark